Robert Brewster may refer to:

 Robert Brewster (American football) (born 1986), American football player
 Robert Brewster (cricketer) (1867–1962), Australian cricketer
 Robert Brewster (Roundhead) (1599–1663), English politician
 Lieutenant General Robert Brewster, fictional character in Terminator 3: Rise of the Machines

See also
 Robert Brewster Stanton (1846–1922), American engineer
 Robert Brewer (American football), active 1981–1982